Meng Heang Tak is an Australian politician and former lawyer. He has been a Labor Party member of the Victorian Legislative Assembly since November 2018, representing the seat of Clarinda.

Heang Tak was born in Cambodia and came to Australia at sixteen years old, studying Law and Arts at Victoria University. Before entering politics he was a lawyer and broadcaster. He was a councillor in the City of Greater Dandenong prior to being elected to Parliament, serving as mayor in 2015–16.

In 2018, Heang Tak won the safe Labor seat of Clarinda, being victorious by over a 16.4% majority. He was inaugurated on 19 December.

Originally a member of Labor Right, Heang Tak defected to Labor Left along with six of his colleagues shortly after the 2022 Victorian state election; the defections of his colleagues and himself meant that Labor Left constituted a majority of the state Labor caucus.

References
Notes

Citations

Year of birth missing (living people)
Living people
Australian Labor Party members of the Parliament of Victoria
Members of the Victorian Legislative Assembly
21st-century Australian politicians
Cambodian emigrants to Australia
Labor Left politicians